Dennis Gale Duncan (January 24, 1943 – October 29, 2014) was an all-star Canadian Football League running back.

After playing college football at Northwestern State University he joined the Montreal Alouettes in 1968 and rushed for 429 yards in his rookie season. The next season was his best in the CFL, with 1037 yards and an eastern All-Star selection.

Duncan's final year in Montreal was good, rushing for 823 yards and catching another 399 yards, but 1970 will always be remembered infamously. The third place Alouettes, coached by Lark great Sam Etcheverry, made cinderella drive for the Grey Cup. But it was without Duncan and Canadian slotback Bob McCarthy, who made headline news when they were suspended after the regular season for breaking the team drinking prohibition (regarding certain establishments.) The Als won the Grey Cup without Duncan.

Duncan played a final year in the CFL with the Ottawa Rough Riders, where he rushed for 760 yards and was once again an All-Star. In all, he rushed for 3049 yards in his 4 year, 52 game career. He died in 2014 from Parkinson's disease.

References

1943 births
2014 deaths
Montreal Alouettes players
Ottawa Rough Riders players
People from Grimes County, Texas